The West Region is one of ten United States regions that currently send teams to the Little League World Series, the largest youth baseball competition in the world. The region's participation in the LLWS dates back to 1957, when it was known as the West Region. However, when the LLWS was expanded in 2001 from eight teams (four U.S. teams and four "International" teams from the rest of the world) to 16 teams (eight U.S. and eight International), the former West Region was split into the Northwest Region and a new West Region. The West Region headquarters is in San Bernardino, California.

The West Region is made up of four districts in three states.

 (Split into "Northern" and "Southern")

Wyoming was a member of the region from 2002 to 2006. During that time, Hawaii was in the Northwest Region. New Mexico was a part of the region in 2001, but was put in the Southwest Region the following year.

Following the 2021 LLWS, Utah and Nevada has been moved to a newly created Mountain Region. The latter region is one of the two new U.S. regions to be created as part of a planned expansion of the LLWS from 16 to 20 teams. This expansion was originally scheduled to occur for 2021, but was delayed to 2022 due to the COVID-19 pandemic.

Regional championship
The list below lists each state's participant in the Little League West Region Tournament. That year's winner is indicated in green. The 2008 Waipahu, 2009 Chula Vista, and 2011 Ocean View teams went on to win the World Series.

2001

2002–2005
In 2002, some Little League regions were realigned. This resulted in Wyoming joining the West Region, Hawaii moving to the Northwest Region, and New Mexico becoming part of the Southwest Region.

  Before the start of the regional tournament, Utah's state champions were disqualified for participating in a non-sanctioned tournament prior to the start of the state tournament. The state's runner-up, who had lost the championship game by forfeit, were awarded the title. However, they would also be disqualified later for the same reason. Little League officials, after failing to find another replacement team on such short notice, decided the regional tournament would have to take place without a team from Utah.

2006–2021
In 2006, Hawaii returned to compete in the West Region, while Wyoming was moved to the Northwest Region.

2022–present
In 2022, Nevada and Utah joined the newly formed Mountain region.

LLWS results
As of the 2022 Little League World Series.

Results by state
As of the 2022 Little League World Series.

See also
Little League World Series 1957–2000 (West Region)
Little League World Series (Northwest Region)

References

External links
Official site

West
Baseball competitions in the United States
Sports in the Western United States